Albert Hermelink Gentiaras (5 August 1898 – 25 February 1983) was a Dutch clergyman and bishop for the Roman Catholic Diocese of Tanjungkarang.

Gentiaras was born on 5 August 1898 in Barger-Compascuum, Netherlands. He joined the Dehonians and was ordained in 1925. On 27 June 1952, he was appointed bishop for the Roman Catholic Diocese of Tanjungkarang. Gentiaras died in Jakarta on 25 February 1983.

References 

1898 births
1983 deaths
Dutch Roman Catholic bishops
People from Emmen, Netherlands
Roman Catholic bishops of Tanjungkarang
Dutch emigrants to Indonesia